Moorefield is an unincorporated community in Nicholas County, Kentucky, United States.  It lies along Routes 36 and 57 southeast of the city of Carlisle, the county seat of Nicholas County.  Its elevation is 988 feet (301 m).  It has a post office with the ZIP code 40350.

Notable people
Robert M. Talbert, Missouri politician and chaplain

References

Unincorporated communities in Nicholas County, Kentucky
Unincorporated communities in Kentucky